Melness (Gaelic: Taobh Mhealanais) is a locality, comprising a group of small remote crofting townships, lying to the west of Tongue Bay opposite Coldbackie, in the north coast of Sutherland, Scottish Highlands and is in the Scottish council area of Highland. The individual hamlets are:
 Achnahuaigh (Gaelic: Achadh na h-Uamha)
 Achininver (Gaelic: Achadh an Inbhir)
 Achintyhalavin
 Lubinvullin (Gaelic: Lùb a' Mhuilinn)
Midfield (Gaelic: Pàirce Meadhanach)
 Midtown (Gaelic: Baile Meadhanach)
 Portvasgo (Gaelic: Port Faisgeach)
 Skinnet (Gaelic: Sgianaid)
 Strath Melness (Gaelic: Strath Mhealanais)
 Strathan (Gaelic: Srathan)
Talmine (Gaelic: Tealamainn)
 West Strathan (Gaelic: Srathan Shuas)

References

Populated places in Sutherland